Anatoly Greshnevikov (born August 29, 1956, Krasnodubrovsky, Zavyalovsky District, Altai Krai) is a Russian political figure and a deputy of the 1st, 2nd, 3rd, 4th, 5th, 6th, 7th, and 8th State Dumas.
 
From 1974 to 1976, Greshnevikov served at the Group of Soviet Forces in Germany. From 1982 to 1990, he worked as a journalist at the Borisoglebsk regional newspaper Novoe Vremya. From 1990 to 1993, he was the deputy of the Congress of People's Deputies of Russia. During the 1993 Russian constitutional crisis he stood for the side of the Supreme Soviet of Russia. In December 1993, he was elected deputy of the 1st State Duma from the Yaroslavl Oblast constituency. On December 17, 1995, he became the deputy of the 2nd State Duma. Later he was re-elected for the 3rd, 4th, 5th, 6th, 7th, and 8th State Dumas, respectively.

Sanctions
In December 2022 the EU sanctioned Anatoly Greshnevikov in relation to the 2022 Russian invasion of Ukraine.

Awards  
 
 Order of Friendship
 Order "For Merit to the Fatherland"

References
 

 

1956 births
Living people
A Just Russia politicians
21st-century Russian politicians
Eighth convocation members of the State Duma (Russian Federation)
Seventh convocation members of the State Duma (Russian Federation)
Sixth convocation members of the State Duma (Russian Federation)
Fifth convocation members of the State Duma (Russian Federation)
Fourth convocation members of the State Duma (Russian Federation)
Third convocation members of the State Duma (Russian Federation)
Second convocation members of the State Duma (Russian Federation)
First convocation members of the State Duma (Russian Federation)
People from Altai Krai